Khanpur Maharis a town in Ghotki District in Northern Sindh province, Pakistan.

References

Cities and towns in Ghotki District